Parliamentary elections were held in Portugal on 26 November 1899. The result was a victory for the Progressive Party, which won 91 seats.

Results

The results exclude seats from overseas territories.

References

Legislative elections in Portugal
1899 elections in Europe
1899 elections in Portugal
November 1899 events